Vīrya (Sanskrit; Pāli: viriya) is a Buddhist term commonly translated as "energy", "diligence", "enthusiasm", or "effort". It can be defined as an attitude of gladly engaging in wholesome activities, and it functions to cause one to accomplish wholesome or virtuous actions.

Etymology
Vīrya literally  means "state of a strong human" or "manliness." In Vedic literature, the term is often associated with heroism and virility. In Buddhism, the term more generally refers to a practitioner's "energy" or "exertion", and is repeatedly identified as a necessary prerequisite for achieving liberation.

In Buddhist contexts, virya has been translated as "energy", "persistence", "persevering," "vigour", "effort", "exertion", or "diligence."

Mental factor
Within the Buddhist Abhidharma teachings, virya is identified as:
One of the six occasional mental factors within the Theravada Abhidharma 
One of the eleven virtuous mental factors within the Mahayana Abhidharma

In this context, virya is defined as the attitude of gladly engaging in what is wholesome; its function is to cause one to accomplish wholesome actions.

The Abhidharma-samuccaya states: 
What is virya? It is the mind intent on being ever active, devoted, unshaken, not turning back and being indefatigable. It perfects and realizes what is conducive to the positive.

In the context of the Mahayana Abhidharma, virya is commonly translated as diligence.

Pali literature
In Buddhism's Pali literature, viriya is identified as critical component in each of the following sets of qualities conducive to Enlightenment (bodhi-pakkhiyā-dhammā):
the five spiritual faculties (indriya)
the five powers (bala)
the ten or six "perfections" (pāramitās)
the seven factors of enlightenment (bojjhaṅga). 
It is also associated with "Right Effort" (sammā-vāyāma) of the Noble Eightfold Path and with the "Four Right Exertions" (samma-ppadhāna).

In the Kīṭāgiri Sutta (MN 70), the Buddha instructs his followers:
... For a faithful disciple who is intent on fathoming the Teacher's Dispensation, it is natural that he conduct himself thus: 'Willingly, let only my skin, sinews, and bones remain, and let the flesh and blood dry up on my body, but my energy [Pali: viriya] shall not be relaxed so long as I have not attained what can be attained by manly strength [purisa-tthāmena], manly energy [purisa-viriyena], and manly persistence [purisa-parakkamena]...."

Other characterizations
It stands for strenuous and sustained effort to overcome unskillful ways (akusala dhamma), such as indulging in sensuality, ill will and harmfulness (see, e.g., ahiṃsa and nekkhamma).

Viriya can also be aroused by strong feelings of Saṃvega and the practice of the charnel ground meditations as outlined in the Satipatthana sutta.

It stands for the right endeavour to attain dhyāna.

Vīrya can also signify courage and physical strength and was cultivated by Buddhist guardians including the Shaolin monks. It signifies strength of character and persistent effort for the well-being of others as well as the ability to defend the Triratna from attacks.

In the absence of sustained effort in practicing meditation, craving creeps in and the meditator comes under its influence. Right effort (vīryabala) is thus required to overcome unskillful mental factors and deviation from dhyāna.

Other meanings
Hindi Language:
Virya means semen in Hindi Language.

See also
Bodhipakkhiya dhamma (Qualities conducive to Enlightenment)
Four Right Exertions
Five Faculties
Five Powers
Noble Eightfold Path
Pañña (wisdom)
Sacca (truth)
Adhiṭṭhāna (resolute determination)
Dāna (generosity)
Passaddhi (tranquillity)
Nekkhamma (renunciation)
Upekkhā (equanimity)
Khanti (patience)
Metta (loving-kindness)
Vīrya (Hinduism)
Sisu (A similar concept in Finnish culture)

Notes

Sources
Bullitt, John T. (2005). A Glossary of Pali and Buddhist Terms.  Available from "Access to Insight" (ATI).
Griffith, Ralph T.H. (1896). Rig Veda.
Guenther, Herbert V. &  Leslie S. Kawamura (1975), Mind in Buddhist Psychology: A Translation of Ye-shes rgyal-mtshan's "The Necklace of Clear Understanding". Dharma Publishing. Kindle Edition.
Ireland, John D. (trans.) (1998). "Meghiya Sutta: Meghiya" (Ud. 4.1). Retrieved 7 February 2011 from "Access to Insight".
Kunsang, Erik Pema (translator) (2004). Gateway to Knowledge, Vol. 1. North Atlantic Books.
Monier-Williams, Monier (1899; rev. 2008). A Sanskrit-English Dictionary. Oxford: Clarendon Press. A general on-line search engine for this dictionary is available from "U. Cologne".
Ñāamoli, Bhikkhu (trans.) & Bhikkhu Bodhi (ed.) (2001). The Middle-Length Discourses of the Buddha: A Translation of the Majjhima Nikāya. Boston: Wisdom Publications. . 
Piyadassi Thera (1999). "Gilana Sutta: Ill (Factors of Enlightenment)" (SN 46.14). Retrieved 7 February 2011 from "Access to Insight". 
Rhys Davids, T.W. & William Stede (eds.) (1921-5). The Pali Text Society's Pali–English Dictionary. Chipstead: Pali Text Society.
Thanissaro Bhikkhu (trans.) (2005). "Kitagiri Sutta: At Kitagiri" (MN 70). Retrieved 6 February 2011 from "Access to Insight".
Walshe, Maurice O'Connell (trans.) (2009). "Pade Sutta: In the Foot" (SN 48.54).  Retrieved 7 February 2011 from "Access to Insight".

Wholesome factors in Buddhism
Sanskrit words and phrases